Zhou Yu (175–210), courtesy name Gongjin, was a Chinese military general and strategist serving under the warlord Sun Ce in the late Eastern Han dynasty of China. After Sun Ce died in the year 200, he continued serving under Sun Quan, Sun Ce's younger brother and successor. Zhou Yu is primarily known for his leading role in defeating the numerically superior forces of the northern warlord Cao Cao at the Battle of Red Cliffs in late 208, and again at the Battle of Jiangling in 209. Zhou Yu's victories served as the bedrock of Sun Quan's regime, which in 222 became Eastern Wu, one of the Three Kingdoms. Zhou Yu did not live to see Sun Quan's enthronement, however, as he died at the age of 35 in 210 while preparing to invade Yi Province (modern Sichuan and Chongqing). According to the Records of the Three Kingdoms, Zhou Yu was described as a strong man with beautiful appearance. He was also referred to as "Master Zhou" (zhoulang 周郎). However, his popular moniker "Zhou the Beautiful Youth" (meizhoulang 美周郎) does not appear in either the Records or the 14th-century historical novel Romance of the Three Kingdoms. Some Japanese literary scholars such as Yoshikawa Eiji and Koide Fumihiko believe that this was a later invention by Japanese storytellers.

Family background
Zhou Yu was from Shu County, Lujiang Commandery, which is present-day Shucheng County, Anhui. Two of his relatives – his greatuncle Zhou Jing, and Zhou Jing's son Zhou Zhong – served as the Grand Commandant in the Han central government, the highest military official position. Zhou Yu's father, Zhou Yi, was a prefect of the imperial capital, Luoyang.

Service under Sun Ce

Friendship
Around the year 191, Sun Jian raised an army to join the Campaign against Dong Zhuo and moved his family from Shouchun (寿春; around present-day Shou County, Anhui) to Zhou Yu's hometown in Shu County. Zhou Yu befriended Sun Jian's eldest son, Sun Ce, who was born in the same year as him. The two became very close friends. Zhou Yu not only offered to let Sun Ce and his family stay in the Zhou family home, but also paid respects to Sun Ce's mother Lady Wu as if she were his mother.

The Jiang Biao Zhuan contains a slightly different account of how Zhou Yu and Sun Ce met each other. It mentions that Zhou Yu heard of Sun Ce's reputation and wanted to meet him, so he travelled from Shu County to Shouchun to visit Sun Ce. The two of them developed such a close friendship that Sun Ce heeded Zhou Yu's advice to bring along his family and relocate from Shouchun to Shu County.

Conquering Jiangdong

Zhou Yu later travelled to Danyang Commandery (丹楊郡; around present-day Xuancheng, Anhui) to join his uncle Zhou Shang, who was serving as the Administrator of Danyang. Around 194, Sun Ce (孙策), then acting under orders from the warlord Yuan Shu, led troops into Yang Province to aid his relatives Wu Jing and Sun Ben against the encroachments of the warlord Liu Yao. While Sun Ce was preparing to cross the Yangtze River at Liyang (歷陽; present-day He County, Anhui) for an attack on Liu Yao, he sent a messenger to inform Zhou Yu about his plans. Zhou Yu led troops to assist Sun Ce, who gratefully told Zhou Yu: "With your aid, I can attain greatness!"

Zhou Yu then joined Sun Ce in his conquests of Hengjiang (橫江; southeast of present-day He County, Anhui, on the northern shore of the Yangtze) and Dangli (當利; east of present-day He County, Anhui). They crossed the Yangtze River, conquered Moling (秣陵; in present-day Nanjing, Jiangsu) and defeated Liu Yao's forces under Ze Rong and Xue Li. They also conquered Hushu (湖孰; southeast of present-day Jiangning, Jiangsu), Jiangcheng (江乘; north of present-day Jurong, Jiangsu), and Qu'e (曲阿; present-day Danyang, Jiangsu). Liu Yao fled in the wake of his defeat and the strength of Sun Ce's forces increased to tens of thousands.

Later service under Sun Ce
Sun Ce told Zhou Yu: "I now have sufficient military power to conquer Wu and pacify the Shanyue. You can return to Danyang and station there." Zhou Yu then made his way back to Danyang. Around 196, Yuan Shu had sent his cousin Yuan Yin to replace Zhou Shang as the Administrator of Danyang, so Zhou Shang and Zhou Yu went to Shouchun (壽春; present-day Shou County, Anhui) to meet Yuan Shu. Yuan Shu wanted to recruit Zhou Yu to serve under him, but Zhou Yu foresaw Yuan Shu's downfall so he pretended to ask for the appointment of Chief of Juchao (居巢; present-day Juchao District, Chaohu, Anhui) while secretly planning to leave Yuan Shu and join Sun Ce. After Yuan Shu approved his request, Zhou Yu travelled to Wu Commandery (around present-day Suzhou, Jiangsu) via Juchao.

In 198, Zhou Yu arrived in Wu Commandery, where Sun Ce personally received and welcomed him. Sun Ce appointed Zhou Yu as General of the Household Who Establishes Might and put him in command of 2,000 troops and gave him 50 horses. Sun Ce said: "Zhou Gongjin is an extraordinary hero and talent. He's very close to me and we are like brothers. I still remember that time when he brought his troops and supplies from Danyang to assist me in my campaign. I can never repay him for his help and contributions."

Zhou Yu was 23 years old at the time, and he was nicknamed "Zhou Lang" (周郎; literally "Zhou the youth") by the people in Wu. He was garrisoned in Lujiang Commandery and later moved to Niuzhu before assuming his appointment as the Chief of Chungu County (春穀縣; northwest of present-day Fanchang County, Anhui). When Sun Ce planned his attack Jing Province (covering present-day Hubei and Hunan), he appointed Zhou Yu as Central Protector of the Army and the Administrator of Jiangxia Commandery. Zhou Yu accompanied Sun Ce in the conquest of Wan (皖; present-day Qianshan County, Anhui). Zhou Yu then joined Sun Ce in attacking Xunyang County (尋陽縣; southwest of present-day Huangmei County, Hubei), where they defeated a minor warlord Liu Xun. They then invaded Jiangxia Commandery (江夏郡; around present-day Xinzhou District, Wuhan, Hubei) and subsequently pacified Yuzhang Commandery (豫章郡; around present-day Nanchang, Jiangxi) and Luling Commandery (廬陵郡; around present-day Ji'an, Jiangxi). Zhou Yu later returned to Baqiu (巴丘; present-day Xiajiang County, Jiangxi) and garrisoned there.

Service under Sun Quan

Advising Sun Quan not to send a hostage
Sun Ce was assassinated in the year 200 by the followers of Xu Gong, a commandery administrator whom he killed earlier. His younger brother, Sun Quan, succeeded him and took control of his territories. Zhou Yu rushed back to Wu Commandery (around present-day Suzhou, Jiangsu) to attend Sun Ce's funeral and remained in Wu Commandery after the funeral. Zhou Yu then held the appointment of Central Protector of the Army. As Sun Quan was still relatively young and inexperienced then, Zhou Yu and Zhang Zhao assisted him in overseeing the day-to-day affairs in the Jiangdong territories.

Around the time, the warlord Cao Cao, who controlled the Han court and the figurehead Emperor Xian, had recently defeated his rival Yuan Shao at the Battle of Guandu and was achieving success in his campaigns to unify northern China. In 202, Cao Cao wrote a letter to Sun Quan, demanding that Sun Quan send one of his sons to the imperial capital Xu (許; present-day Xuchang, Henan) as a hostage, so as to secure Sun Quan's allegiance towards him. Sun Quan gathered all his subjects, including Zhang Zhao and Qin Song, for a discussion, but they could not arrive at a conclusion.

Sun Quan was reluctant to send one of his sons to be a hostage in the capital, so he had another discussion with only his mother Lady Wu and Zhou Yu. Zhou Yu said: 

Lady Wu agreed with Zhou Yu and she said: "What Gongjin said is true. Gongjin was around the same age as Bofu as he was only a month younger than Bofu. I see Gongjin as a son, so you should treat him like an elder brother." Sun Quan heeded their advice and did not send a hostage to Cao Cao.

Battles against Huang Zu
In 206, Zhou Yu and Sun Quan's cousin Sun Yu attacked bandits at Ma and Bao counties and killed their chiefs and captured thousands of enemies. Later that year, Huang Zu, the Administrator of Jiangxia Commandery (江夏郡; around present-day Xinzhou District, Wuhan, Hubei), sent his subordinate Deng Long to lead a few thousand troops to attack Sun Quan's forces in Chaisang Commandery (柴桑郡; around present-day Jiujiang, Jiangxi). Zhou Yu attacked Deng Long, captured him alive, and sent him as a prisoner-of-war to Wu Commandery (around present-day Suzhou, Jiangsu).

In the spring of 208, Sun Quan ordered an attack on Jiangxia, which was defended by Huang Zu. Zhou Yu was assigned as the Chief Commander of the Front Army and he, along with Lü Meng, Ling Tong and others, scored a major victory over the enemy. Huang Zu was killed by Sun Quan's forces when attempting to escape.

Advising Sun Quan to go to war with Cao Cao
In the late autumn of 208, Cao Cao started a campaign aimed at wiping out all opposing forces in southern China. When his forces arrived in Jing Province (covering present-day Hubei and Hunan), the provincial governor Liu Cong surrendered without putting up any resistance. When Sun Quan's men heard that Cao Cao had obtained tens of thousands of Jing Province's land and naval troops, they were all very afraid because they knew Cao Cao's next target was Sun Quan's territories in Jiangdong.

Cao Cao wrote a letter to Sun Quan as follows: "Of late, I have been leading a punitive campaign in accordance with an imperial decree. Liu Cong surrendered when I led the imperial army to the south. Now, I have 800,000 naval troops under my command, and I wish to participate in a hunting expedition in Wu with you, General." Sun Quan summoned all his subjects for a meeting to discuss how to counter an impending invasion by Cao Cao. Many of them turned pale when he showed them the letter.

Some of Sun Quan's followers suggested to surrender to Cao Cao on the grounds that the strength of their armed forces was not comparable to Cao Cao's. Zhou Yu, however, had a different opinion and he said: 

Sun Quan replied: "The old villain has harboured the intention of usurping the Han dynasty for a long time, but he feared the two Yuans (Yuan Shao and Yuan Shu), Lü Bu, Liu Biao and me. Now, all the others have been destroyed and I am the only one left. The old villain and I cannot coexist together. Your idea of going to war coincides closely with my thoughts. This is a sign that Heaven has granted you to me." He then drew his sword, slashed the table in front of him and said: "Any of you who dares to speak of surrendering to Cao Cao shall end up like this table!"

Later that night, Zhou Yu came to see Sun Quan and said: 

Sun Quan placed his hand on Zhou Yu's shoulder and replied: 

Pei Songzhi, who annotated Zhou Yu's biography in the Sanguozhi, argued that Lu Su was actually the first person who urged Sun Quan to resist Cao Cao. Zhou Yu was at Poyang County before Sun Quan held the discussion with his subjects, and Lu Su suggested to Sun Quan to summon Zhou Yu back for the meeting. Zhou Yu and Lu Su gave similar advice to Sun Quan, which resulted in Sun Quan arriving at his decision to go to war with Cao Cao. Pei Songzhi argued that it was unfair to Lu Su because Zhou Yu's biography gave full credit to Zhou Yu for being the only person to urge Sun Quan to resist Cao Cao, and failed to mention that Lu Su had already urged Sun Quan to resist Cao Cao before Zhou Yu did.

Battle of Red Cliffs

Around the time, Liu Bei had recently been defeated by Cao Cao at the Battle of Changban, and he planned to lead his followers south across the Yangtze River. Liu Bei met Lu Su at Dangyang, where they discussed the formation of an alliance between Liu Bei and Sun Quan. Liu Bei then moved to Xiakou (夏口; present-day Hankou, Hubei) and garrisoned there. At the same time, he also sent his adviser Zhuge Liang to accompany Lu Su to meet Sun Quan and discuss a Sun–Liu alliance. Sun Quan ordered Zhou Yu and Cheng Pu to lead his forces to join Liu Bei in resisting Cao Cao, and they rendezvoused at Red Cliffs. A plague had broken out in Cao Cao's army, so Cao Cao lost to the allied forces in an early skirmish between both sides. Cao Cao then moved his camp to the northern bank of the Yangtze River while the allies remained at the south.

Huang Gai, one of Sun Quan's generals, told Zhou Yu: "The enemy are superior in numbers in comparison with our side. I fear that we cannot last long. However, I observe that Cao Cao's ships are linked to each other. We can destroy them by fire." He also wrote a letter to Cao Cao, pretending that he wanted to surrender and defect to Cao Cao's side.

The wind was blowing strongly from the southeast. When Huang Gai's fleet reached the middle of the river, the ships all raised their sails, and Huang Gai lifted a torch and instructed his men to shout "We surrender!" Cao Cao's troops came out of the camp to look and they said Huang Gai was coming to join them. When Huang Gai was about 20 li away from the enemy base, he ordered his men to set the ships on fire and they boarded the smaller boats behind. As the wind was very strong, the flaming ships sailed towards Cao Cao's warships at fast speed and caused them to catch fire as well. Cao Cao's ships were all burnt down and the flames also spread quickly to his camps on land. Zhou Yu then ordered an attack on Cao Cao's base and scored a major victory. Cao Cao retreated north with his surviving troops after his defeat. Zhou Yu and Liu Bei led their respective forces in pursuit of Cao Cao, but Cao had already fled.

Battles of Jiangling

After his defeat at Red Cliffs, Cao Cao returned to Xu (許; present-day Xuchang, Henan) and left Cao Ren and others behind to defend Jiangling County, the capital of Nan Commandery. Zhou Yu and Cheng Pu led their troops towards Nan Commandery and were separated from Cao Ren's forces by the river. Liu Bei told Zhou Yu: "Cao Ren is defending Jiangling and he has much supplies in the city. He poses a big threat to us. I will send Zhang Yide with 1,000 men to accompany you, while you dispatch 2,000 troops to follow me. We will then cross the Xia River (夏水; a tributary of the Yangtze River starting from southeast of Shashi District and ending at north of Jianli County in Hubei) and attack Cao Ren's rear. When Cao Ren hears that we have infiltrated his rear, he will definitely retreat." Zhou Yu agreed to Liu Bei's suggestion.

Zhou Yu later ordered Gan Ning to station at Yiling (夷陵; present-day Yichang, Hubei). Cao Ren sent a separate cavalry force to besiege Yiling, so Gan Ning sent an urgent request to Zhou Yu for reinforcements. Zhou Yu followed Lü Meng's advice and left Ling Tong to defend his current position while leading Lü Meng and others to help Gan Ning. After the siege at Yiling was lifted, Zhou Yu and his troops crossed the Yangtze River and attacked Jiangling, with Zhou personally participating in battle. He was hit on his right side by a stray arrow and had to retreat due to the severity of the wound. When Cao Ren heard that Zhou Yu was wounded and bedridden, he led his troops to outside Zhou Yu's camp and taunted the Wu troops. Zhou Yu got out of bed and personally inspected his men and encouraged them to raise their morale. Cao Ren saw that and retreated.

By 209, Zhou Yu and Cao Ren had held up against each other for over a year and both sides had sustained heavy casualties. Cao Cao could no longer afford the continuous losses in personnel and materiel, so he ordered Cao Ren to withdraw from Jiangling.

Advice to Sun Quan on how to deal with Liu Bei
After the victory at the Battle of Jiangling, Sun Quan appointed Zhou Yu as a Lieutenant-General and the Administrator of Nan Commandery. Zhou Yu's headquarters were at Jiangling County while he was in charge of Xiajun, Hanchang, Liuyang and Zhouling counties.

Liu Bei assumed the appointment of Governor of Jing Province with his administrative centre at Gong'an County. When Liu Bei later met Sun Quan at Jing (京; present-day Zhenjiang, Jiangsu), Zhou Yu wrote to Sun Quan: 

Sun Quan considered that Cao Cao was still a threat in the north, so he thought it would be better for him to have more allies instead of creating hostility between him and Liu Bei. Besides, he was also worried that Liu Bei's men might not submit to him, so he rejected Zhou Yu's idea.

Death
Around 210, Liu Zhang was serving as the Governor of Yi Province (covering present-day Sichuan and Chongqing), and he faced the threat of his rival Zhang Lu in Hanzhong Commandery. Zhou Yu went to see Sun Quan and proposed: "Cao Cao is still recovering from his defeats and he faces internal threats, so he will not go to war with you any time soon. I seek your permission to let me and Sun Yu lead an army to invade Shu (Yi Province) and attack Zhang Lu after that. Sun Yu will then remain behind to defend the conquered territories and form an alliance with Ma Chao. I will join you in attacking Cao Cao at Xiangyang, and together we can conquer the north." Sun Quan agreed.

Zhou Yu then headed back to Jiangling County to make preparations for the campaign. However, he died of illness at Baqiu (巴丘; present-day Yueyang, Hunan) on the way back. He was 36 years old (by East Asian age reckoning) at the time of his death.

Before Zhou Yu's death, he recommended Lu Su to Sun Quan to be his successor.

Sun Quan deeply mourned Zhou Yu's death. He shed tears and said: "Gongjin possessed the calibre of a talented adviser to a ruler. Now that he has died at such a young age, who can I still rely on?" He even wore plain garments to express his sorrow, which touched many people. After a funeral was held for Zhou Yu at Baqiu, his body was transported back to Wu Commandery (around present-day Suzhou, Jiangsu). Sun Quan received the procession at Wuhu and personally paid for all the expenses. He also issued an order allowing Zhou Yu's family to keep retainers.

In 229, nearly two decades after Zhou Yu's death, when Sun Quan declared himself the emperor of the state of Eastern Wu, he told his subjects: "I wouldn't have become an emperor today if there wasn't Zhou Gongjin to assist me."

Family
Sometime between 198 and 199, Zhou Yu joined Sun Ce in the conquest of Wan (皖; present-day Qianshan County, Anhui). In Wan, they met a certain Elder Qiao, who had two daughters who were famed for their beautiful looks. Sun Ce married the elder sister while Zhou Yu married the younger one. Sun Ce joked with Zhou Yu: "Although Elder Qiao's daughters are exceptionally beautiful, with us as their husbands, it should be a happy enough match" (because Sun Ce and Zhou Yu were both known for being handsome youths). 

Zhou Yu had two sons and a daughter. It is unknown whether or not his three children were born to his wife Xiao Qiao.

Zhou Yu's daughter, Zhou Ying, married Sun Quan's eldest son Sun Deng, who was designated as the crown prince after his father became the emperor of Eastern Wu. Sun Deng later died at the age of 32, preceding his father.

Zhou Yu's elder son, Zhou Xun, resembled his father in personality, but died very early. He married Sun Quan's daughter Sun Luban and served as a Cavalry Commandant in Eastern Wu.

Zhou Yu's younger son, Zhou Yin, married a woman from Sun Quan's clan. He served as the Commandant of Xingye and was placed in command of 1,000 troops and garrisoned at Gong'an County. In 229, after Sun Quan became emperor, he granted Zhou Yin the title of a Marquis of a Chief District. Zhou Yin was exiled to Luling Commandery (廬陵郡; around present-day Ji'an, Jiangxi) later for committing an offence. In 239, Zhuge Jin and Bu Zhi wrote a memorial to Sun Quan, requesting for Zhou Yin to be pardoned and restored of his marquis title and appointment on account of his father's contributions. Sun Quan was reluctant to do so, as he noted the severity of Zhou Yin's offence and said that Zhou Yin had not shown any sign of remorse. However, after much urging from Zhuge Jin, Bu Zhi, Zhu Ran and Quan Cong, Sun Quan eventually agreed, but Zhou Yin had died of illness in exile around the time when the pardon was issued.

Zhou Jun, the son of Zhou Yu's elder brother, was appointed as a Lieutenant-General and placed in command of 1,000 men by Sun Quan because of his uncle's meritorious service. After Zhou Jun died, Quan Cong requested for Sun Quan to commission Zhou Jun's son, Zhou Hu, as a military officer but Sun declined. Sun Quan replied, "In the past, we managed to defeat Cao Cao and obtain Jing Province because of Gongjin's efforts. I have never forgotten his contributions. When I heard of Zhou Jun's death, I intended to recruit Zhou Hu into the civil service, but I have also heard that Zhou Hu is ruthless and treacherous in his ways. I was worried he will cause trouble if he is given an official appointment so I decided to not recruit him. My memories of Gongjin are lasting. How can I ever stop missing him?"

Personal life
Zhou Yu was described to have strong physique and handsome looks. When Zhou Yu became close friends with Sun Ce, Sun Ce's mother Lady Wu told Sun Ce's younger brother Sun Quan to treat Zhou Yu like an elder brother. After Sun Quan succeeded Sun Ce, his subordinates did not observe the full protocol when they paid their respects to him. Zhou Yu was the only and the first person to follow all the formalities and etiquette when he paid respect to Sun Quan.

Zhou Yu was known to be a magnanimous and generous man who won the hearts of many people with his character. However, there was one person he could not get along well with – Cheng Pu. Cheng Pu was much older than Zhou Yu, and he often insulted and belittled the latter, but Zhou Yu tolerated him. Cheng Pu was so impressed with Zhou Yu that he eventually changed his attitude towards Zhou Yu and treated him respectfully. He even remarked: "Being with Zhou Gongjin is like drinking the finest of wines. You get carried away and become drunk before even realizing it."

Sometime early in Zhou Yu's career, Cao Cao heard of Zhou's talent and wanted to recruit Zhou Yu to serve under him, so he sent Jiang Gan to persuade Zhou Yu to defect to his side. However, Zhou Yu indirectly affirmed his loyalty to Sun Quan in front of Jiang Gan, and hinted to Jiang Gan that he cannot be persuaded to switch his allegiance. When Jiang Gan later returned to Cao Cao, he told Cao Cao that "Zhou Yu's magnanimity was too great to be described in words".

Around 209, after visiting Sun Quan at Jing (京; present-day Zhenjiang, Jiangsu), Liu Bei was on his journey back to Jing Province when Sun Quan, along with Zhang Zhao, Qin Song, Lu Su and others, rushed to catch up with Liu Bei to see him off. Sun Quan then held a farewell banquet for Liu Bei. After the feast, the others left while only Liu Bei and Sun Quan remained behind. When they spoke of Zhou Yu, Liu Bei said: "Gongjin's talents and abilities are far greater than those of thousands of others. He possesses great ambitions and he may not be willing to remain subordinate for long." In another incident, after his defeat at the hands of Zhou Yu at the Battle of Red Cliffs, Cao Cao remarked: "I am not ashamed of having lost the battle." He later wrote to Sun Quan: "At the Battle of Red Cliffs, my men were affected by a plague, so I burnt my warships and retreated of my own accord. That resulted in Zhou Yu claiming the glory (of winning the battle)." Zhou Yu's widespread fame incurred much jealousy towards him, which was why Cao Cao and Liu Bei attempted to slander him and sow discord between him and Sun Quan.

Zhou Yu was known to be very learned in music from a young age. Even after three rounds of drinking at a banquet, he could still detect a mistake or a wrong note when a musical piece was being played. When that happened, he would look up at the musician. There was a saying at that time to describe this: "If there is a problem with the tune, Zhou Yu will look up."

In Romance of the Three Kingdoms
Zhou Yu is featured as a major character in the 14th-century historical novel Romance of the Three Kingdoms, which romanticises the historical events before and during the Three Kingdoms period. The novel fabricated the rivalry between him and Zhuge Liang. Zhou Yu is depicted to be extremely jealous of Zhuge Liang's talent and relentlessly attempt to outwit the latter on several occasions but never succeeds. His roles in the events leading to, and during the Battle of Red Cliffs, are largely overshadowed by Zhuge Liang's. Furthermore, his death is heavily dramatised in the novel and intentionally triggered by Zhuge Liang. Zhou Yu sustains an arrow wound at the Battle of Jiangling against Cao Ren's forces, and his condition deteriorates after Zhuge Liang makes him angry by foiling his plans on three occasions later. On the third time, Zhou Yu coughs blood and dies.

See the following for some fictitious stories in Romance of the Three Kingdoms involving Zhou Yu:
 List of fictitious stories in Romance of the Three Kingdoms#Zhuge Liang's diplomatic mission to Jiangdong
 Jiang Gan#In fiction
 List of fictitious stories in Romance of the Three Kingdoms#Borrowing arrows with straw boats
 Huang Gai#In fiction
 List of fictitious stories in Romance of the Three Kingdoms#Zhuge Liang prays for the eastern wind
 List of fictitious stories in Romance of the Three Kingdoms#Liu Bei and Lady Sun's marriage
 List of fictitious stories in Romance of the Three Kingdoms#Zhou Yu's death

In popular culture

Chinese opera
In Chinese opera, Zhou Yu is cast as a xiaosheng (小生; young character) or wusheng (武生; character in military dress), even when he appears together with Zhuge Liang, who was actually younger than he was. In Kun opera, Zhou Yu appears as a zhiweisheng, as in the scene The Swaying Reeds, in which Zhang Fei captured him but released him later.

Film and television
Notable actors who have portrayed Zhou Yu in film and television include Hong Yuzhou (Romance of the Three Kingdoms), Tony Leung (Red Cliff), and Victor Huang (Three Kingdoms).

The anime Ikki Tousen and Koutetsu Sangokushi make references to Zhou Yu, in which he is known by his Japanese name "Shuuyu Koukin".

Games

Zhou Yu is a playable character in Koei's Dynasty Warriors and Warriors Orochi video game series. He also appears in Koei's Romance of the Three Kingdoms strategy game series and in Capcom's Destiny of an Emperor as an enemy general.

In the collectible card game Magic: The Gathering there is a card named "Zhou Yu, Chief Commander" in the Portal Three Kingdoms set.

See also
 Lists of people of the Three Kingdoms

Notes

References
 Citations from Sanguozhi volume 54

 Citations from other parts of the Sanguozhi

 Citations from the Sanguozhi zhu

 Other citations

 Chen, Shou (3rd century). Records of the Three Kingdoms (Sanguozhi).
 
 Luo, Guanzhong (14th century). Romance of the Three Kingdoms (Sanguo Yanyi).
 Pei, Songzhi (5th century). Annotations to Records of the Three Kingdoms (Sanguozhi zhu).
 Sima, Guang (1084). Zizhi Tongjian.

175 births
210 deaths
Generals under Sun Quan
Han dynasty generals from Anhui
Han dynasty musicians
Han dynasty politicians from Anhui
Musicians from Anhui
Officials under Sun Quan
Politicians from Hefei
Political office-holders in Hubei
Political office-holders in Jiangxi
Sun Ce and associates
Yuan Shu and associates